The 2003–2004 session was a session of the California State Legislature.

Major legislation

Enacted
 California Shine the Light Law (S.B. 27), a landmark privacy law governing customers' rights in a business's disclosure of personal information to third parties.

Pending or failed

Vetoed

Members
Skip to House of Representatives, below

Senate

  Democrats: 25
  Republicans: 15

The party affiliation and district numbers of Senators are listed after their names in this list.

President Pro Tem: John L. Burton (D-3)
Majority Leader: Don Perata (D-9)
Minority Leader: Jim Brulte (R-31) to May 10, 2004; Dick Ackerman (R-33) from May 10, 2004

Assembly

  Democrats: 48
  Republicans: 32

Officers

Speaker Fabian Núñez (D-46) from February 9, 2004
Herb J. Wesson, Jr. (D-47) to February 9, 2004
Speaker pro Tempore Christine Kehoe (D-76)
Assistant Speaker pro Tempore Leland Yee (D-12)
Majority Leader Wilma Chan (D-16)
Majority Floor Leader Marco Antonio Firebaugh (D-50)
Minority Floor Leader Kevin McCarthy (R-32) from January 5, 2004
Dave Cox (R-5) to January 5, 2004
Chief Clerk E. Dotson Wilson
Sergeant at Arms Ronald Pane

Analysis of Bills

Full list of members, 2003-2004
The party affiliation and district numbers of Assembly members are listed after their names in this list.

Greg Aghazarian (R-26)
Patricia C. Bates (R-73)
John J. Benoit (R-64)
Patty Berg (D-1)
Rudy Bermúdez (D-56)
Russ Bogh (R-65)
Ronald S. Calderon (D-58)
John Campbell (R-70)
Joseph Canciamilla (D-11)
Wilma Chan (D-16)
Ed Chavez (D-57)
Judy Chu (D-49)
Dave Cogdill (R-25)
Rebecca Cohn (D-24)
Ellen M. Corbett (D-18)
Lou Correa (D-69)
Dave Cox (R-5)
Lynn Daucher (R-72)
Manny Diaz (D-23)
John A. Dutra (D-20)
Robert D. Dutton (R-63)
Mervyn M. Dymally (D-52)
Marco Antonio Firebaugh (D-50)
Dario Frommer (D-43)
Bonnie Garcia (R-80)
Jackie Goldberg (D-45)
Loni Hancock (D-14)
Tom Harman (R-67)
Ray Haynes (R-66)
Jerome Horton (D-51)
Shirley Horton (R-78)
Guy S. Houston (R-15)
Hannah-Beth Jackson (D-35)
Rick Keene (R-3)
Christine Kehoe (D-76)
Paul Koretz (D-42)
Jay La Suer (R-77)
John Laird (D-27)
Doug LaMalfa (R-2)
Mark Leno (D-13)
Tim Leslie (R-4)
Lloyd E. Levine (D-40)
Sally J. Lieber (D-22)
Carol Liu (D-44)
John Longville (D-62)
Alan Lowenthal (D-54)
Ken Maddox (R-68)
Abel Maldonado (R-33)
Barbara S. Matthews (D-17)
Bill Maze (R-34)
Kevin McCarthy (R-32)
Cindy Montañez (D-39)
Dennis Mountjoy (R-59)
Gene Mullin (D-19)
Alan Nakanishi (R-10)
George Nakano (D-53)
Joe Nation (D-6)
Gloria Negrete McLeod (D-61)
Fabian Núñez (D-46)
Jenny Oropeza (D-55)
Robert Pacheco (R-60)
Nicole Parra (D-30)
Fran Pavley (D-41)
George A. Plescia (R-75)
Sarah Reyes (D-31)
Keith Richman (R-38)
Mark Ridley-Thomas (D-48)
Sharon Runner (R-36)
Simon Salinas (D-28)
Steven N. Samuelian (R-29)
S. Joseph Simitian (D-21)
Todd Spitzer (R-71)
Darrell Steinberg (D-9)
Tony Strickland (R-37)
Juan Vargas (D-79)
Herb J. Wesson, Jr. (D-47)
Pat Wiggins (D-7)
Lois Wolk (D-8)
Mark Wyland (R-74)
Leland Yee (D-12)

See also
 List of California state legislatures

2003-2004
2003 in sports in California
2004 in California
California
California